KFW may refer to: 
Keith Fullerton Whitman (born 1973), an American musician
KfW or Kreditanstalt für Wiederaufbau, a German public-sector financial institution